The first electoral unit of Republika Srpska is a parliamentary constituency used to elect members to the House of Representatives of Bosnia and Herzegovina since 2000. It consists of the municipalities of Krupa na Uni, Novi Grad, Kozarska Dubica, Prijedor, Ostra Luka, Kostajnica, Gradiska, Latasi, Srbac, Prnjavor, Petrovac, 
Banja Luka, 
Čelinac, 
Istočni Drvar, 
Ribnik, 
Mrkonjić Grad, 
Jezero, 
Kneževo, 
Kotor Varoš, 
Šipovo and 
Kupres.

Demographics

Representatives

Election results

2022 election

2018 election

2010 election

2002 election

2000 election

References 

Constituencies of Bosnia and Herzegovina